The Order of the Crown of Romania is a chivalric order set up on 14 March 1881 by King Carol I of Romania to commemorate the establishment of the Kingdom of Romania. It was awarded as a state order until the end of the Romanian monarchy in 1947. It was revived on 30 December 2011 as a dynastic order.

Classes
The order had five classes, most of them with limited numbers:
 Grand Cross (limited to 25)
 Grand Officer (limited to 80)
 Commander (limited to 150)
 Officer (limited to 300)
 Knight (unlimited numbers)

Insignia

Decoration

The religious character of the model of 1881 is a red-enamelled, eight-pointed Maltese Cross with wider margin of gold and white. In the angles of the cross were "C"s, the initials of the founder. The medallion in the middle of the cross shows a royal crown on dark red background. The medallion is surrounded by a white-frost edge surrounded the inscription PRIN NOI INSINE (by ourselves) and the order's foundation date of 14 March 1881.  On the back of the medallion is 10 Mai (May 10), the National Day as well as the years 1866 (enthronement of Carol and the foundation of the Romanian dynasty), 1877 (proclamation of Romanian fully independence), 1881 (proclamation of the Kingdom and of Carol as King of Romania).

Other
The Order's sash or ribbon is light blue with two silver stripes.  Grand Cross members wore the decoration on a sash from the right shoulder to left waist, Grand Officers and Commanders around the neck and Knights and Officers on the left breast. For the two highest classes of the order an eight-pointed silver star was also worn on the left breast, Grand Cross members wearing it as an order-insignia and Grand Officers as a medallion, surrounded by four royal crowns since 1932.

Recipients

Grand Cross 
Ibrahim of Johor
Prince Lorenz of Belgium, Archduke of Austria-Este
Princess Alice, Duchess of Gloucester
Princess Muna al-Hussein
Jean-Baptiste Billot
Nicolae Ciupercă
Arved Crüger
Joseph Dietrich
John Dill
Max von Fabeck
Josef Harpe
William Horwood
August Kanitz
Živojin Mišić
Hendrik Pieter Nicolaas Muller
Mihailo Petrović
Radomir Putnik
Jovan Mišković
Lt.-col. Constantin C. Roșescu, participant in Operation Autonomous
Radu R. Rosetti
Nicholas Medforth-Mills 
Lech Wałęsa, 2nd President of Poland
George Julian Zolnay

Grand Officer class
Dhimitër Beratti
Katō Hiroharu (1920) Rear Admiral, Imperial Japanese Navy

Commander class
Erich Abraham
Arthur Irving Andrews (1878–1967), American college professor. Awarded c. 1929 for "historical writings on Rumanian subjects".
Henry Bond (1873-1919), British Army officer
Kurt Lottner
Gheorghe Manoliu

Order class
Kennedy, Clyde McLean Awarded July 1919 - Lieutenant 20th Battalion (CEF)

References

External links

Orders, decorations, and medals of Romania
1881 establishments in Romania
Awards established in 1881